Jerry Grundhoefer ( Grundy) (1930–1997) was a jazz musician who played clarinet, piano, saxophone, organ, xylophone, and flute in Birmingham, Alabama.  In 1980, Grundhoefer was inducted into the Alabama Jazz Hall of Fame.

Early life

Born in St. Paul, Minnesota on July 22, 1930. Grundhoefer graduated from Cretin High School, (now Cretin-Derham Hall High School).

Career

Grundhoefer's first public performances were playing organ at St. Paschal Catholic Church where he met Bernie Fitch, his future wife. Fitch and Grundhoefer were married at St. Croix River in 1950. Subsequently, he worked for American Dereck machines.  Approximately one year later, Grundhoefer was working as a salesman for Hobart Sales and Services, playing music on the side.

Due to job transfers, the family moved from St. Paul to Atlanta to Raleigh, NC, while Grundhoefer opened offices for Hobart in these cities. They finally settled permanently in Birmingham, Alabama in 1965. By this time, they had 9 children and Bernie was expecting another. They had 2 more children together after the move.

Grundhoefer opened Grundy's Jazz Music Hall in 1979 in Birmingham, a bar where jazz musicians played live music daily. Grundy's later changed locations in 1980 to a larger venue with tapas restaurant with the bar in order to expand for bigger musical acts.  Among those musicians who performed at Grundy's were Buddy Rich, Count Basie, Maynard Ferguson, Buddy Guy, Koko Taylor, Johnny O'Neal, Royce Campbell, Clark Terry, Ray Reach and many others. Grundy's closed in 1992.

After the closing of Grundy's, Grundhoefer continued to play in other Birmingham venues including Marty's Bar and Grill. Marty Eagle, the owner of Marty's, said of Grundhoefer in the Black and White City Paper, “I had Grundy in here on Sundays after Grundy's went out of business. He ran the jazz night, and nobody else could hold it together like he could. Somebody had to be the disciplinarian. And none of the others wanted to discipline any of the other people. But Jerry wanted a good show, and he did it right.”

Death

In 1992, Grundhoefer was diagnosed with prostate cancer. He received a second diagnosis in 1993 of multiple myeloma. He died June 10, 1997.

References

American jazz musicians
1930 births
1997 deaths
Deaths from multiple myeloma
20th-century American musicians